Thomas Clinton (13 April 1926 – 9 August 2009) was a professional footballer.

Clinton began his career at Dundalk in his native Ireland before joining Everton in March 1948. He made 80 appearances for Everton (73 League and 7 FA Cup appearances) scoring 5 goals (4 League and 1 FA Cup).

After eight seasons at Goodison Park, Clinton was sold to Blackburn Rovers in April 1955, where he played only six games. He subsequently signed for Tranmere Rovers in July 1956, where he finished his professional career.

At international level, Clinton appeared three times for the Republic of Ireland between 1951 and 1954.

References

 The Complete Who's Who of Irish International Football, 1945-96 (1996):Stephen McGarrigle

1926 births
2009 deaths
Dundalk F.C. players
League of Ireland players
Republic of Ireland association footballers
Everton F.C. players
Blackburn Rovers F.C. players
Tranmere Rovers F.C. players
Republic of Ireland international footballers
Ireland (FAI) international footballers
Runcorn F.C. Halton players
English Football League players
Association football defenders
Expatriate footballers in England
Irish expatriate sportspeople in England
Republic of Ireland expatriate association footballers
Association footballers from Dublin (city)